Culham was a rural district in Oxfordshire, England from 1894 to 1932.  It was formed under the Local Government Act 1894 from the part of the Abingdon Rural Sanitary District in the administrative county of Oxfordshire. The remainder of the sanitary district, in the administrative county of Berkshire, became Abingdon Rural District. The rural district council continued to be based at Abingdon, holding meetings in the workhouse of the poor law union.

Parishes
The rural district consisted of ten civil parishes:
Burcot
Chislehampton
Clifton Hampden
Culham
Drayton St Leonard
Marsh Baldon
Nuneham Courtenay
Sandford on Thames
Stadhampton
Toot Baldon

Abolition

Culham Rural District was abolished under a County Review Order in 1932, merging with a number of other districts to form Bullingdon Rural District. Since 1974 the area has formed part of the South Oxfordshire district.

References

https://web.archive.org/web/20071001015955/http://www.visionofbritain.org.uk/relationships.jsp?u_id=10089645

History of Oxfordshire
Districts of England created by the Local Government Act 1894
Rural districts of England